The following list includes all of the Canadian Register of Historic Places listings in Kootenay Boundary Regional District, British Columbia.

References 

(references appear in the table above as external links)

Kootenay Boundary Regional District